This is a list of notable solo cello pieces. It includes arrangements and transcriptions.

A
Joseph Abaco
(11) Caprices 
Samuel Adler
Sonata (1965)
Kalevi Aho
Solo IV (1997)
Hugh Aitken
For the Cello (1980)
Franghis Ali-Zadeh
Ask Havasi (part of the cycle Silk Road) (1998)
Oyan (2005)
Maarten Altena
Figura (1993)
Georges Aperghis
Quatres Récitations (1980)
Sonate (1994)
Gilbert Amy
Quasi Scherzando 
Tanya Anisimova
Sufi Suite 
Song on Mt. San Angelo 
Georgi Arnaoudov
Kells (1999)
Three Sonets of Michelangelo (2014)
Violet Archer
Improvisation (1983)
Malcolm Arnold
 Fantasy  (1987)
 Daniel Asia
 Cello Suite
 Lera Auerbach
 Sonata for Solo Violoncello, Op. 72 (2003)
 La Suite dels Ocells [Homage to Pablo Casals] (2015)

B
Johann Sebastian Bach
Six Suites (c. 1720)
Nicolas Bacri 
Suite , Op. 31, No. 1 Preludio e metamorfosi (1987–94)
Suite , Op. 31, No. 2  Tragica (1991–93)
Suite , Op. 31, No. 3 Vita et Mors (1991–93)
Suite , Op. 50, No. 4 (1994–96; written for Emmanuelle Bertrand)
Henk Badings
Sonata No. 2
David N. Baker
 Sonata (1990)
Don Banks
 Sequence (1967)
Gennady Banshchikov
Concerto for cello No. 3 for solo cello (1965)
Granville Bantock
 Sonata in G minor (1924)
Rami Bar-Niv
Improvisation
Arnold Bax
Rhapsodic Ballad (1939)
Sally Beamish
Gala Water for solo cello (1988, for her husband Robert Irvine)
The Wise Maid
Conrad Beck
Epigrams  (for Paul Sacher)
Grant Beglarian
Elegy for Cellist for solo cello (1979)
Paul Ben-Haim
Music  (1974)
Richard Rodney Bennett
Partita (2001)
Sonata 
Scena II (1973)
Niels Viggo Bentzon
Sonata, Op. 110 (1956)
Variations on "The Volga Boatmen", Op. 354 (1974)
16 Etudes, Op. 464 (1984)
Sonata, Op. 110
Esteban Benzecry
Suite "Prisme du Sud" (1970)
Gunnar Berg
Suite pour violoncelle seul (1950)
Michael Berkeley
Iberian Notebook Suite (1980)
Luciano Berio
Les mots sont allés (1978; for Paul Sacher)
Sequenza VIb (1981)
Chanson pour Pierre Boulez (Song for Pierre Boulez) (2000)
Sequenza XIV (2002)
Christoph Otto Beyer
Sonate für Violoncello solo (2006)
Passacaglia e Fuga 
Gunther Bialas
Romanze (for Hoelscher) (1987)
Jörg Birkenkötter
Solo für Violoncello (1986)
Ernest Bloch
Suite No. 1  (1956) (written for Zara Nelsova)
Suite No. 2 (1956) (written for Zara Nelsova) 
Suite No. 3 (1957) 
William Bolcom
Suite in C minor (1994)
Ennio Bolognini
Adagio and Allegro 
Fiesta Baska - Lamada Montanesa 
Seranata de Bolonini 
Seranata del Eco 
Serenata Del Gaucho 
Prelude and Fugue on a theme of Purcell
Cello's Prayer
Nimrod Borenstein
"Soliloquy, Op. 59"
Sergei Bortkiewicz
 Suite, Op. 41
Hans Bottermund - Janos Starker
Variations on a Theme by Paganini
 Hendrik Bouman
 Suite in D major (2003)
Reiner Bredemeyer (1929–1995)
Solo 1 (1973)
Solo 6 (1980; written for H.J. Scheitzbach)
Allen Brings
Sonata da chiesa for solo cello (1980, dedicated to Alexander Kouguell)
Benjamin Britten
Cello Suites (Suite No. 1, Op. 72 (1964), Suite No. 2, Op. 80 (1967), Suite No. 3, Op. 87 (1972))
Tema "Sacher" (for Paul Sacher)
Stephen Brown
Cello suites
 Takkakaw Falls (2003, 2004)
 Fire (2005, revised 2012)
 There Was a Lady in the East (2007)
 Lilies and the Roses (2011, revised 2013)
 Magneto (2012)
 Flowers of the Forest (2013)
Leo Brouwer
Sonata  (1960)
Mikhail Bukinik
4 Concert Etudes  (No. 4 in F minor)
Sylvano Bussotti
Deborah Parker (1987)
Variazione
Yuri Butzko
Partita for solo cello

C
John Cage
One8 (1991) 
59½ Seconds  (1953)
Atlas Eclipticallis (1961)
Solo For Cello (1958)
Variations I (1958)
Etudes Boreales (1978)
Elliott Carter
Figment (1994)
Figment No. 2, Remembering Mr. Ives (2001)
Gaspar Cassadó
Suite  (1926)
Geghuni Chitchjan
Sonata for solo cello (1983) 
Frédéric Chopin
Etude in A major, Op. 25, No. 1 (trans. Cassadó)
Nigel Clarke
Spectroscope (1987)
Grant Colburn
Sonata in D minor for baroque cello or viola da gamba (2009)
Michael Colgrass
Wolf (1975)
Giuseppe Colombi (1635–1694)
Chiacona a Basso Solo (1670)
Toccata da Violone Solo (Toccata ) (1670)
John Corigliano
Fancy on a Bach air (1997; premiered by Yo-Yo Ma)
Henry Cowell
Gravely and Vigorously (Hymn & Fuguing Tune No. 17) (1963; in memory of Kennedy) 
George Crumb
 Sonata for Solo Cello, (1955)

D
Luigi Dallapiccola
Adagio (1947)
Ciaccona, Intermezzo e Adagio (1945)
Jean-Luc Darbellay
Solo (1997)
Michael Daugherty
Jackie's Song (2000)
Johann Nepomuk David
2 Solo Sonatas 
Mario Davidovsky
Synchronisms No. 3 (1964), and electronic sound
Robert deMaine
Twelve Études-Caprices, Op. 31 (1999)
Unaccompanied Sonata 
 Edison Denisov
Cadenzas for two cello concertos in D major and C major by Haydn (1982)
 Patrick van Deurzen
Monologue (2011)
David Diamond
Sonata for Violoncello Alone (1959)
Friedhelm Dohl
Fantasie - Kadenz 
Klezmeriana for solo cello (1983)
Franco Donatoni
Lame (1982)
Friedrich Dotzauer
113 Etudes for Cello 
John Downey
Lydian Suite (1975)
Zsolt Durkó
Solo Suite No. 1 (1979)
Henri Dutilleux
Trois Strophes sur le Nom de SACHER (1976–82) (for Paul Sacher)

E

David Eby
Celtic Passage 
Gerald Eckert
Nôema (1992/93)
Søren Nils Eichberg
Variations on a theme by Niccolo Paganini (2005)
Jose Elizondo
Unter dem Sternenhimmel des Rheins (Under the starry sky of the Rhine) (2020)
Cantabrigian Reflections (2020)
Danzas Latinoamericanas (Latin American Dances) (1997)
Otoño en Buenos Aires (Autumn in Buenos Aires) (1997)
Pan de Azúcar (Sugar Loaf mountain) (1997)
Atardecer Tapatío (Sunset in Guadalajara) (1997)
Baroque Dances (1997)
La alborada de la esperanza (The Dawn of Hope) (2018)
Limoncello (2018)
Crepúsculos (Twilights) (2018)
Princesa de hadas (Fairy Tale Princess) (1995)
Excursión a la montaña (Excursion to the Mountain) (1995)
Hans Ulrich Engelmann
Mini-music to Siegfried Palm, Op. 38 (1970)
Sven Einar Englund
Suite (1986)
Gottfried von Einem
Music, Op. 108 (1996)
Iván Erőd
Hommage á Beethoven, Op. 24 (Rhapsodie für Violoncello solo über Themen der Sonate, Op. 102/1 von Ludwig van Beethoven) (1977)
Rudolf George Escher
Sonata for solo Violoncello (1945–48)
Pozzi Escot
Sonata (2002)

F
Morton Feldman
Projection I (1950)
Intersection IV (1953)
Richard Festinger
Upon The Viol (2012) 
Ross Lee Finney
Chromatic Fantasy in E (1957)
Graciane Finzi
Theme and Variations to el cant dels ocells
Elena Firsova
The Rest is Silence (2002)
Luboš Fišer (1935–1999)
Sonata (1987)
Thomas Flaherty
Semi-Suite (1990)
Remembrance of Things Present (2006)
Alexandra Fol
Almost Serial (1999)
Carlo Forlivesi
Più Mesto for 2-bow solo cello (2003)
Wolfgang Fortner
Suite (Schott) (for Paul Sacher)
Zum Spielen für den 70. Geburtstag: Theme and Variationen (1976)
Ilse Fromm-Michaels
Suite, Op. 15 (Sikorski)
Rudolf Escher
Sonata (1955)

G

Domenico Gabrielli
Seven Ricercari (1689)
 Hans Gál
 Sonata for violoncello solo op.109a (1982)
Orlando Jacinto Garcia
Crystalline Sounds of the Night
Ada Gentile
Pervioloncellosolo (1996)
Michael Gielen
Weitblick Sonata (1991)
Alberto Ginastera (1916–83)
Puneña No. 2, Op. 45 (Hommage à Paul Sacher)
Detlev Glanert
Fünf Wüstenlieder (five Desert Songs) (1999)
Philip Glass
Songs and Poems (in 7 movements) (2007)
Orbit (2013)
Friedrich Goldmann
Cellomusik (1974)
Marin Goleminov
Sonata (1969)
Osvaldo Golijov
Omaramor (1991) 
Andrei Golovin
Elegy for solo cello (1988)
Yevgeny Golubev
2 Etudes for solo cello, Op. 46 (1961) 
Concert Aria for solo cello (1961) 
Leonid Grabovsky (Hrabovsky) 
Hlas I (1990)
Voices for solo cello (1990)
Olivier Greif
Solo from Nô, Op. 154, for Christoph Henkel (1981) for solo cello
Jorge Grundman
Terezin Through the Eyes of the Children for Solo Cello (2012)
Sofia Gubaidulina
Ten Preludes (1974)
Quaternion for solo cello

H
Alois Haba
Fantasy in quarter-tones (1924)
 Daron Hagen
 Suite (1985)
 Higher, Louder, Faster, an editorial etude (1987)
Cristobal Halffter
Variations on the theme eSACHERe (for Paul Sacher)
Hermann Haller
Trois pieces pour violoncelle seul (3 pieces )
George Frideric Handel
Air and Variations "The Harmonious Blacksmith" from Suite for Harpsichord in E major, HWV 430 arr. Cassadó
Passacaglia - Theme and Variations (arr. Zinoviy Dynov based on the Halvorsen version)
John Harbison
 Suite (1994)
Jonathan Harvey
 Curve with Plateaux for Helen Verney (1983)
Teppo Hauta-aho
Improvatio (1971)
David Philip Hefti
 Ritus - 4 Dance Collages (2007)
Bernhard Heiden
Variations on "Lilliburlero"
Paavo Heininen
Cantilena I, Op. 24c (1970)
Cantilena II, Op. 26 (1970)
Poesie des pensées, Op. 23 (1970)
Hans Werner Henze
Serenade (1949)
Capriccio (for Paul Sacher) (1976/1981)
Michael Hersch
Sonata No. 1 (1994)
Sonata No. 2 (2001)
Kenneth Hesketh
Die hängende Figur ist Judas (Drei Perspektiven) (1998)
IMMH (2014)
Jacques Hétu
Variations, Op. 11b (1967)
Gilad Hochman
 Rhapsody  (2003)
 Ponderings on a Memory (2005)
Jennifer Higdon
Suite (2002)
Paul Hindemith
 Sonata, Op. 25, No. 3 (1923)
Joel Hoffman
Concert-Study (Fantasie) (1977)
unaccompanied minor (2007)
Robin Hoffmann
Schleifers Methoden für Violoncello solo (2005)
York Höller
Sonata (1968)
Heinz Holliger
Chaconne  (for Paul Sacher) (1975)
Trema (1981)
Vagn Holmboe
Solo Cello Sonata, M. 241 (1968–69)
Imogen Holst
Fall of the Leaf
Joaquim Homs
Arbres al vent (1992)
Soliloqui num. 4 (1994)
Capvespre vora el mar (1994)
Arthur Honegger
Paduana in G major, H.181 (1945)
Alan Hovhaness
Yakamochi, Op. 193 (1965)
Edgar Hovhanessian (Oganesyan)
Sonata for solo cello (1970)
Klaus Huber
Transpositio ad Infinitum für ein virtuoses Solocello (for Paul Sacher)
Nicolaus A. Huber
Der Ausrufer steigt ins Innere (1984)
Tobias Hume
Kleine Stücke für Cello solo (Small pieces ) Book 1 (originally for Gamba) (arranged by Sabina Lehrmann)
(Cello solo pieces) Book 2
Bertold Hummel
Fantasia I in G, Op. 77d1 (1952)
Fantasia II in memoriam Pablo Casals, Op. 97a (1993)
Farewell (2002)

I

Jacques Ibert
Etude-Caprice pour un tombeau de Chopin (1949)
Ghirlarzana (1950)
Yoshirō Irino (1921–1980)
Three Movements (1969)

J
Karl Jenkins
Benedictus - The Armed Man (2001)
Jan Jirásek 
Dilema (1987)
Ben Johnston
Toccata for Laurien Laufman (1984)
Betsy Jolas
Scion (1974)
Episode cinquième (1983)
Andre Jolivet
Suite en Concert (1965)
Christian Jost
Laulos (2005)
Gordon Jacob
Serenade 
Divertimento 
Jurgis Juozapaitis
Sonata for solo cello

K
Dmitry Kabalevsky
Études in Major and Minor, Op. 68 (1961)
Mauricio Kagel
Siegfriedp‘  (1971)
Giya Kancheli
Having Wept for solo cello (1994)
Nikolai Kapustin
Introduction and Scherzino for solo cello, Op. 93 (1999) 
Suite for cello solo, Op. 124 (2004) 
Faradzh Karayev (aka Faraj Garayev)
Terminus for solo cello (1985) 
Hugo Kauder
Suite  (1925)
Second Suite  (1924)
Frederick Kaufman
Inner Sanctum (1999)
Tālivaldis Ķeniņš
Sonata for Cello Solo  (1981)
Jin Hi Kim
Kee Maek #4 (1995)
Natalie Klouda
Suite for Solo Cello (2017, revised 2019)
Volker David Kirchner
Und Salomo sprach (‘’And Salomo spoke”) (1987)
Aus dem Buch der Konige 3 meditations (2000)
Threnos (written for the Feuermann Competition 2006)
Aram Khachaturian
Sonata-Fantasy in C major, Op. 104 (1974)
Adam Khudoyan
Sonata No. 1 (1961)
Sonata No. 2 Elegiac (1984)
Sonata No. 3 Pathetic (1993)
Mark Kilstofte
You [unfolding] for solo cello (1996)
Julius Klengel
 Suite in D-minor, Op. 56
 Caprice in the Form of a Chaconne (with free use of a Theme by Robert Schumann), Op. 43
Alexander Knaifel
Lamento for solo cello (1967) 
Capriccio for solo cello (1994) 
Zoltán Kodály
 Solo Cello Sonata, Op. 8 (1915)
 Capriccio (1915)
Nikolai Korndorf
Passacaglia (1997)
Irena Kosíková
Stopy (2004)
Ernst Krenek
 Suite, Op. 84 (1942)
Hanna Kulenty
Sinequan: for violoncello (amplified and delay) (1993)
Still Life with a Cello (1998)
György Kurtág
Pilinszky János: Gérard de Nerval (1986, for Zoltán Kocsis) for solo cello
19 Jelek, játékok és üzenetek (Signs, Games and Messages) (1987–2008) for solo cello
Schatten (Shadows) (1999, for Miklós Perényi)
Az hit (Faith)
Hommage à John Cage, Elakadó szavak (Faltering Words) for solo cello
György Kroó in memoriam (1997) for solo cello
For Steven: In Memoriam Pauline Mara (2010), for solo cello
The Hilary Jig (to Hilary Behrens 90) (2017, fellow-composer Márta Kurtag)
Khristofer Kushnaryov :ru:Кушнарёв, Христофор Степанович)
Sonata for solo cello (1932) 
Mati Kuulberg (:fi:Mati Kuulberg)
Concerto-Sonata for solo cello (1973)

L 

 Sophie Lacaze
 Variations sur quatre haikus (2009)
 Helmut Lachenmann
 Pression (1970)
 Ezra Laderman
 Partita (1972)
 A Single Voice (1995, written for Tanya Anisimova)
Fantasy (1998)
A Single Line (2004)
Frank La Rocca
Secret Thoughts (1986)
Henri Lazarof
Momenti (1987)
Claude Ledoux
Le Songe trouble de l'orchidee (1994)
12 Studies - First book (1994)
Benjamin Lees
Night Spectres (2000)
Kenneth Leighton
Sonata, Op. 52 (1967)
Tania Leon
4 Pieces (1981)
Milcho Leviev
Reflected Meditation (1980)
Augsburg Polka (1998)
György Ligeti
Sonata (1948–1953)
Magnus Lindberg
Stroke (1984)
Partia (2001)
Franz Liszt
Sonata in B minor for solo cello (transcription by Johann Sebastian Paetsch)
Jerry Liu
Suite 7 Days (2012)
Calor (2016)
Vassily Lobanov
Sonata for solo cello (1963) 
Fantasie, Op. 48 (1987)
Pietro Locatelli
Il Laberinto Armonico (transcription by Rohan de Saram)
Alvin Lucier
 Indian Summer (1993)
Witold Lutosławski
Sacher Variation (1975; for Paul Sacher)

M

Peter Machajdík
Ponor (2019) 
Wolds (2019) 
Lullaby (1999) 
Olga Magidenko
Site of the Heart, Op. 60 (1998) 
Enrico Mainardi
Sonata breve (1942)
Sonata (1959)
Ivo Malec
Arco-1 (1987)
Vitold Malishevsky
Suite
Benedetto Marcello
 Cello sonatas
Andrew March
Three Pieces for Solo Cello (2011) 
Ljubica Marić
Monodia Octoïca for solo cello
Steven Harry Markowitz
Impromptu 
A Brief Adventure 
Pamela J. Marshall
Soliloquy 
Donald Martino
Parisonatina Al’Dodecafonia (1964)
Tauno Marttinen
Impression, Op. 140 (1978)
Colin Matthews
Palinode (1992)
David Matthews
Fantasia, Op. 8 (1971)
Songs and Dances of Mourning, Op. 12 (1976)
Journeying Songs, Op. 95 (2004)
Rudolf Matz
11 Caprices 
Ombres et lumières (Lights and Shadows) 
Suite in C major 
Tema con Variazioni 
Toshiro Mayuzumi
Bunraku (1960)
John McCabe
Partita (1966)
Alfred Mendelssohn
Suite (1960)
Usko Meriläinen
Arabesques (1964)
Krzysztof Meyer
Sonata (1964)
Moment musical (1976)
Monologue (1990)
Peter Mieg
La sombre (1971)
L'aérienne (1975)
Eric Moe
The Lone Cello (1998) for 'cello solo
Robert Moevs
Heptachronon (1969)
 Alan Mills
Song & Dance for solo cello (2007)
Roberto Molinelli
Crystalligence (commissioned by Enrico Dindo) (2005)
 Dexter Morrill
Fantasy (1995)
Robert Muczynski
Gallery: Suite (on paintings of Charles Burchfield) (1966)
Isabel Mundry
Komposition (1992/93)
Komposition (1997)

N
Florie Namir
Rolling, fantasia for cello solo (2004)
Lior Navok
Fantasy (1998)
Arkady Nesterov
Sonata for solo cello
Joaquin Nin-Culmell
Suite
Akira Nishimura
Threnody (1998)
Arne Nordheim
Clamavi (1980)

O
Mark O'Connor
Appalachia Waltz (composer's own transcription of original version for solo violin)
Mikhail Osokin
Sonata for solo cello
Terry Winter Owens
Cellestial Music, Book 1 (2003)

P
Younghi Pagh-Paan
AA-GA I (1984)
Hilda Paredes
Zuhuy Kak (1997)
Robert Parris
Fantasy and Fugue (1954)
Boris Parsadanjan
Sonata for solo cello (1973)
Paul Patterson
Suite, Op. 62
Sergei Pavlenko
Sonata for solo cello (1983) 
Krzysztof Penderecki
Capriccio per Siegfried Palm (1968)
Per Slava (1986)
Suite for Solo Cello (2013) [Expanded version of previously published "Divertimento"]
George Perle
 Cello Sonata (1947)
Hebrew Melodies
Vincent Persichetti
Solo Cello Sonata, Op. 54
Sven Holger Philippsen
Cellosolosonate Nr.1 in 4 Sätzen (1988)
Praeludium - Vivace e con fuoco
Élégie (Adagio con affetto)
Rondo vivacissimo
Carlo Alfredo Piatti
12 Caprices, Op. 25
 1 in G minor: Allegro quasi presto
 2 in E-flat major: Andante Religioso
 3 in B-flat major: Moderato
 4 in D minor: Allegretto
 5 in F major: Allegro comodo
 6 in A-flat major: Adagio Largamente
 7 in C major: Maestoso
 8 in A minor: Moderato ma energico
 9 in D major: Allegro
 10 in B minor: Allegro deciso
 11 in G major: Adagio. Allegro
 12 in E minor: Allegretto
Capriccio on the cavatina "I tuoi frequenti palpiti" from ‘’Niobe’’ by Giovanni Pacini, Op. 22
Gregor Piatigorsky
Syrinx 
A Stroll 
Ástor Piazzolla
6 Tango Etudes (arr. Karttunen)
Wolfgang Plagge
Jakobsstigen, Op. 20 : Fantasy (1983)
Music , Op. 54 (1990)
Peteris Plakidis
Two Variations for solo cello (1976) 
Robert H.P. Platz
Senko-hana-bi (In Yoshitake's garden) (1997–2000)
Conrad Pope
Sonata for Violoncello alone (1972)
Gerhard Präsent
A Rayas for violoncello solo (2001–02)
Sergei Prokofiev
Solo Cello Sonata, Op. 133 (1953) (unfinished; completed by Blok in 1996) 
March from Music for Children, Op. 65 - (ed. Piatigorsky)

R
Nikolai Rakov
Waltz for solo cello 
Shulamit Ran
Fantasy Variations (2003)
Alexander Raskatov
Dramatic Games for solo cello (1979) 
Kyrie Eleison (1992)
Einojuhani Rautavaara
Sonata, Op. 46 (1969)
Max Reger
 3 Suites, Op. 131c (1914)
Suite No. 1 in G major
Suite No. 2 in D minor 
Suite No. 3 in A minor 
Aribert Reimann
Solo II (1981)
Phillip Rhodes
Three Pieces 
Alan Ridout
Partita (1959)
Wolfgang Rihm
Great (1972)
Joaquin Rodrigo
Como una fantasía (1979)
Scott Roller
Mutamusic (1983)
Bernhard Romberg
Sonata in E minor Op. 38 No. 1
Sonata in G major Op. 38 No. 2
Lucia Ronchetti
Forward and downward, turning neither to the left nor to the right (2017)
Ned Rorem
After Reading Shakespeare Nine movements alone (written for Sharon Robinson; 1980)
Hilding Rosenberg 
Intermezzo (1974)
Miklos Rozsa
Toccata capricciosa, Op. 36 (1979; in memory of Piatigorsky)
Edmund Rubbra
 Improvisation, Op. 124 (pub. 1967)
Elena Ruehr
 Lift (2013) for solo cello, premiered at MIT (written for Jennifer Kloetzel)
Cricket the Fiddler (2020), commissioned by Jennifer Kloetzel, solo cello, premiered online October 2020, ca 8’
Cloud Forest (2015) solo cello, 8 minutes, commissioned by Rhonda Rider

Peter Ruzicka
Sonata, Op. 9 (1969)
Stille Four Epilogues (1976)

S

Kaija Saariaho
Petals (1988)
Près (1992)
Spins & Spells (1997)
 Sept Papillons (2000)
Aulis Sallinen
Elegy for Sebastian Knight, Op. 10 (1964)
Sonata, Op. 26 (1971)
Vadim Salmanov
Monologue for solo cello (1970) 
Esa-Pekka Salonen
Yta III (1987)
Timothy Salter
Scintilla for solo cello (2003)
David Sampson
Three Arguments for unaccompanied cello (1993)
Ruben Sarkisjan
Cercio Ceclamando (Cycle of Declamations) for solo cello (2001)
Ahmed Adnan Saygun
Partita, Op. 31 (1954)
Robert Saxton
 Sonata on a Theme of Sir William Walton (1999)
Giacinto Scelsi
Triphon (1956)
Trilogie (1957/65)
 Voyages (1985)
 Maknongan (1976)
Gerhard Schedl
Aus Zwei Stücke aus der Schatz-Truhe
Peter Schickele (P. D. Q. Bach)
Vermillion Suite (1987)
Suite No. 1 All By Its Lonesome
Suite No. 2 All By Its Lonesome
Josef Schillinger
Dance Suite for solo cello, Op.20 (1928) 
Thomas Daniel Schlee
Three Signs, Op. 53 (2002)
Friedemann Schmidt-Mechau
Aposiopesis Music for violoncello (1990)
Morgenlachen (Morning Laughter) Music for violoncello (1997)
Fehlversteck (Flawed Hide-Out) Five musical sketches for a cellist (2007)
Ent-Gegnung (Re-Tort) music for cello (2020)
Artur Schnabel (1882–1951)
Sonata (in four movements) (1931)
Alfred Schnittke
Klingende Buchstaben (Sounding Letters) (1988)
Madrigal in Memoriam Oleg Kagan (1990)
Improvisation (1993)
Franz Schubert
Erlkönig - Le Roi des Aulnes (The Erlking or Elf King; adapted in 1890 by Bernhard Cossmann 
Gunther Schuller
Fantasy, Op. 19 (1960)
Laura Schwendinger
All the Pretty Horses (2009)
Primavera Trasformata(2020)
Salvatore Sciarrino
Due Studi (1947)
Ai Limiti Della Notte (1984)
Peter Sculthorpe
 Requiem (1979)
Threnody (In memory of Stuart Challender) (1991)
Into the Dreaming (1993)
Tailitnama Song (1997)
Roger Sessions
 Six Pieces (1966)
Rodion Shchedrin
Russian Tunes for solo cello, Op.79 (1990)
Alexander Shchetynsky
Sonata (2001)
Bright Sheng
 Diu Diu Dong (Seven Tunes Heard in China) (1995)
Rodion Shchedrin
Russian Tunes (Russkie Naigryshi), Op. 79 (1990)
Makoto Shinohara
Evolution (1986–90)
Jean Sibelius
Theme and Variations in D minor (written in 1887, discovered in 1995)
Sergei Slonimsky
3 Pieces for solo cello (1964) 
Haskell Small
Suite 
Dmitry Smirnov
Monogram, Op. 58A (1990)
Elegy in memory of Edison Denisov, Op. 97a (1997)
Family Portrait, Op. 108 (1998)
Postlude in memory of Alfred Schnittke, Op. 112A (2000)
Bagatelle, Op. 128A (2001)
Saga to S.A. Gubaidulina, Op. 130 (2001)
Naresh Sohal
Monody (1976)
Shades III 
Shades IV (1983)
Giovanni Sollima
La luna (1986)
6 Caprices (1987)
Segno (1992)
Anno uno (1993)
The Songlines (1993)
Lamentatio (1998)
Pasolini fragments (1998)
Alone (1999)
Halsey Stevens
Sonata (five movements - Introduction, Ciaccona, Scherzo, Notturno, Finale) (1958)
Peter Vukmirovic Stevens
 August Ruins (2010)
 Tempus Edax Rerum (2011)
 Etude for Raising the Dead (2011)
 Versatile Hammers (2011)
 Thunder, Perfect Mind (2012)
Mark Summer
 Julie-O
 Lo, How a Rose E'er Blooming
 Kablimba (all pizzicato)
Viktor Suslin
Chanson contre raison Sonata (1984)
Schatz-insel (1990)
Randall Svane
Suite No. 1 (1979)
Suite No. 2 (1982)
Suite No. 3 (1988)
Takehiko Sueoka
Cello Sonata Unaccompanied (1997)

T
Emil Tabakov
Bis (1982)
Josef Tal 
Suite for cello (1937)
Sonata for cello (1937)
Treatise for cello (1973)
In Memoriam of a Dear Friend for cello (1985)
Giuseppe Tartini
L'Arte dell'Arco (The Art of the Bow) 50 variations on Corelli's Gavotte from Op.5, No.10 (1758) (transcribed by Paul Bazelaire)
John Tavener
Thrinos (1990)
Chant (1995)
Boris Tchaikovsky
Suite  (in six movements) (1946)
Suite in five movements (1960)
Alexander Tcherepnin
Suite, Op. 76 (1946)
James Tenney
 Cellogram for Joel Krosnick (1971)
Dimitri Terzakis
Omega 1 (1978)
Dialog der Seele mit ihrem Schatten (1991; for Siegfried Palm)
Augusta Read Thomas
 Spring Song (1995)
Jukka Tiensuu
 Balzo
Ton That Tiet
Bois terre 
Boris Tishchenko
Sonata No. 1, Op. 18 (1960)
Sonata No. 2, Op. 76 (1979)
Ernst Toch
Impromptu in three movements, Op. 90c (1963)
Glosa (2004)
Javier Torres Maldonado
Tiento (2000; also version for cello and electronics, 2003)
Paul Tortelier
Suite in D minor (1944)
Donald Tovey
Solo Cello Sonata in D, Op. 50
Sulkhan Tsintsadze 
Chonguri (Tchonguri) (1978)
Sonata (1975)

U

Chinary Ung
Kshe Buon (1981)

V
Fabio Vacchi
In alba mia, dir... (1995)
Johanna Varner
The Windmill, MCV 2001 (2019)
Pēteris Vasks
Gramata cellam (Das Buch) (1978)
Sándor Veress
 Sonata (1935)
Carl Vine
Inner World (1994)
Param Vir
Flame (1997)
Giovanni Battista Vitali 
Partite per il Violone (1680)
Partita sopra diverse Sonate
Antonio Vivaldi
Cello Sonatas RV 38-47 (c. 1720-1730)
Vladimir Vlasov
Ballade for solo cello 
Improvisation for solo cello 
Wladimir Vogel
Poeme (1974)

W
Wolfram Wagner
Sonata, Op. 31 (1990)
Gwyneth Walker
In Memoriam (1980)
William Walton
 Passacaglia (1980)
Rodney Waschka II
Ravel Remembers Fascism (1991)
Graham Waterhouse
Three Pieces for Solo Cello, Op. 28 (1992)
Threnody (2002)
in nomine for cello solo (2013)
Variations for Cello Solo (2019)
Ben Weber
Dance, Op. 28 (1948)
Dance, Op. 31 (1949)
Mieczysław Weinberg (or Vainberg)
Solo Cello Sonata No. 1, Op. 72 (1960)
Solo Cello Sonata No. 2, Op. 86 (1965)
Solo Cello Sonata No. 3, Op. 106 (1971)
Solo Cello Sonata No. 4, Op. 140 (1986)
Twenty-four Preludes, Op. 100 (1968)
Egon Wellesz
 Cello Sonata, Op. 31 (1920)
 Suite op. 39 (1924)
Richard Wernick
 Suite No. 1 (2003)
 Suite No. 2 (2007)
David Wilde
 The Cellist of Sarajevo - A Lament in Rondo Form, Op. 12
Adrian Williams
Solo Cello Sonata (1976–77)
John Williams
Three Pieces  (2001) 
Richard Edward Wilson
Lord Chesterfield to his Son (1987)
Music  (1971)
Stefan Wolpe
Piece Alone (1966)
William Wordsworth
Sonata for Violoncello (1961)
Charles Wuorinen
Cello Variations I to Fred Sherry (1970)
Cello Variations II (1975)
Cello Variations III (1997)

X
Iannis Xenakis
 Kottos (1977)
 Nomos Alpha (1966)

Y
James Yannatos
Sonata
Yehuda Yannay
I can't fathom it... and projections (1993)
Tangoul Morṭii (Tango of Death) (1997)
Eugène Ysaÿe
 Cello Sonata, Op. 28 (1924)
Isang Yun
Glissées (1970) for Siegfried Palm
Seven Etudes (1993)
Ludmilla Yurina
Irrlicht for solo cello (2000) 
Iraida Yusupova
Dreams' Music for solo cello (1990)

Z
Edson Zampronha
Elegia and electroacoustics (2009)
Two Takes (2008)
Toccata (1989)
Bernd Alois Zimmermann
 Sonata (1959–60)
 Short Studies (4)  (1970)
Sergei Zhukov
Sonata-Capriccio for solo cello (1980) 
Paraphrase on van Eyck's poem De Tuinman en de Dood for solo cello (2003) 
Vassily Zverev
Sonata-Fantasy for solo cello

See also
String instrument repertoire
List of double concertos for violin and cello
List of triple concertos for violin, cello, and piano
List of compositions for cello and piano
 Cello sonata

References

External links 
 Repertoire 
 Finnish Composers
 Bulgarian Music 
 Database of contemporary cello music
 Music from cello2go site

 
 
Cello solo